Onustus indicus is a species of large sea snail, a marine gastropod mollusk in the family Xenophoridae, the carrier shells.

Description

Distribution
Onustus indicus is distributed in the tropical Indian Ocean (excluding Arabian Sea), the central Indo-Pacific and the westernmost Pacific (Hong Kong to southern Indonesia) as well as in northern tropical-subtropical eastern and western Australia. It can be found between 4 and 150 m.

References

External links

Xenophoridae
Gastropods described in 1791
Taxa named by Johann Friedrich Gmelin